Vic Nankervis may refer to:

Vic Nankervis (footballer, born 1893) (1893–1973), Australian rules footballer who played for Essendon and Fitzroy
Vic Nankervis (footballer, born 1918) (1918–1986), Australian rules footballer who played for Geelong, Footscray, St Kilda and South Melbourne